The UW–Milwaukee Panther Arena (originally the Milwaukee Arena and formerly MECCA Arena and U.S. Cellular Arena) is an indoor arena located in Milwaukee, Wisconsin. The arena, which seats as many as 12,700 people and offers  of floor space, is part of a larger downtown campus, that includes the Milwaukee Theatre and Wisconsin Center.

The arena was part of the MECCA Complex from 1974 until the 1995 opening of the Midwest Express Center.

History
The arena opened in 1950 and was one of the first to accommodate the needs of broadcast television. It was folded into MECCA (The Milwaukee Exposition, Convention Center and Arena) when the complex opened in 1974. It is also known for its former, uniquely painted basketball court by Robert Indiana in 1978, with large orange 'M's taking up both half-courts representing Milwaukee. The Indiana floor was purchased by a fan in the early 2010s and is currently in storage at a storage facility in Milwaukee.

It was home to the Milwaukee Hawks (1951–55) and the Milwaukee Bucks of the NBA (1968–1988), and hosted the 1977 NBA All-Star Game before an audience of 10,938. The venue was also home to Marquette University's men's basketball team along with the United States Hockey League's/International Hockey League's Milwaukee Admirals. These teams all moved to the now-defunct BMO Harris Bradley Center upon the arena's opening in 1988.

On October 26, 2017, the Bucks returned to the arena for a regular season game against the Boston Celtics in honor of their 50th anniversary in the NBA. For this event, the Bucks, by agreement with Indiana, installed a newly built floor featuring a duplicate of his original MECCA court for that game only. After the game, the floor was sanded down to remove the replica of Indiana's original work and moved to Menominee Nation Arena in Oshkosh, home to the Bucks' NBA G League affiliate, the Wisconsin Herd (although the team does not play on the floor used in the commemorative game).

In 1994, the Wisconsin Center District (WCD), a state organization, was created in order to fund the Midwest Express Center, and, in 1995 the MECCA complex was folded into this, including the Arena (the now demolished BMO Harris Bradley Center and the newly opened Fiserv Forum are owned by a separate authority). Following a major overhaul in 1998, the arena is now home to the Milwaukee Wave of the Major Indoor Soccer League (including the 2006 MISL All-Star game) and is the Milwaukee venue for Disney on Ice.

The WCD added the Wisconsin Athletic Walk of Fame alongside the U.S. Cellular Arena in 2001. At the end of this public promenade is a Wisconsin Historical Marker noting the location where Christopher Sholes invented the first practical typewriter, featuring the QWERTY keyboard layout.

As the MECCA, the building hosted first- and second-round games in the Mideast Regional of the 1984 NCAA tournament. The U.S. Cellular Arena also hosted all or part of every Horizon League men's basketball conference tournament from 2003 to 2011.

In 2008 and 2009, it was home to the Milwaukee Bonecrushers of the Continental Indoor Football League.

On August 7, 2010, the arena hosted an Arena Football League playoff game between the Milwaukee Iron and the Chicago Rush. The Iron played their 2010 regular season home games at the BMO Harris Bradley Center, but the ongoing installation of the new center court scoreboard in that venue forced the home playoff games to be played at the U.S. Cellular Arena, where the Iron would go on to win.

It is also home to the Brewcity Bruisers roller derby league.

Milwaukee Panthers connection and renaming 
The arena has been the home of the Milwaukee Panthers men's basketball team at three different times—first from 1993 to 1998, then from 2003 to 2012, and since 2013. The Panthers played their 2012–2013 home games at the 3,500-seat Klotsche Center on UWM's east side campus. The move generated complaints from some Panthers fans and attendance lagged as the team had its worst record since the 1990s. After Amanda Braun was named UWM's athletic director in March 2013, she said she would re-examine the decision to move games from the U.S. Cellular Arena. In July 2013, UWM officials reached a 5-year contract with the arena owner, Wisconsin Center District, that runs through the 2017–2018 season.

U.S. Cellular's naming rights expired on May 31, 2014, and they did not renew their contract. On June 26, 2014, it was announced that the Arena would be renamed the UW–Milwaukee Panther Arena, as part of an agreement which would run at least through 2024, with UWM having an option to extend it through 2029. The deal additionally makes the arena officially the major site for UWM events such as graduation ceremonies, a role it had already taken for years before.

On March 16, 2016, it was announced the Admirals signed a 10-year lease with a five-year mutual extension. Also included on the deal was $6.3 million for upgrades to the arena.

Seating capacity
The seating capacity for basketball has changed as follows:

Other uses

Concerts
Since the 1960s, the Arena has held a number of concerts by high-profile performers. The Beatles headlined a performance in the Arena as part of their historic 1964 U.S. tour, and Elvis Presley performed 2 back-to-back shows at the Arena in 1972. He would return again in 1974 and 1977, with the latter occurring 4 months before his death later that year.

In 1980, Queen performed at the Arena. Bob Dylan played a two-night stand there as part of his Fall 1981 tour, and returned in both 1999 and 2001 for one-night appearances. The Grateful Dead performed there during their spring 1989 tour.

Professional wrestling
The arena has also hosted professional wrestling events, including WCW's SuperBrawl (1992), Clash of the Champions XXXIV (1997) and Mayhem (2000). It also hosted the World Wrestling Federation's King of the Ring (1996), and Over the Edge (1998). It was at the aforementioned King of the Ring card where Stone Cold Steve Austin first uttered his now-famous "Austin 3:16" catchphrase. It was scheduled to host the April 1, 2020 edition of All Elite Wrestling Dynamite before coronavirus-related public assembly concerns postponed the circuit's Milwaukee show to August 25, 2021.

Images

See also
MECCA Great Hall – a convention center and part of the MECCA complex
List of NCAA Division I basketball arenas

References

External links
 Official Site

1950 establishments in Wisconsin
Basketball venues in Wisconsin
College basketball venues in the United States
Former National Basketball Association venues
Indoor arenas in Wisconsin
Indoor ice hockey venues in Wisconsin
Indoor soccer venues in the United States
Marquette Golden Eagles basketball venues
Milwaukee Bucks venues
Milwaukee Panthers men's basketball
Music venues completed in 1950
Soccer venues in Wisconsin
Sports venues completed in 1950
Sports venues in Milwaukee